This list of fictional cars contains either cars that are the subject of a notable work of fiction, or else cars that are important elements of a work of fiction. For the purpose of this list, a car is a self-propelled artificial vehicle that runs in contact with the ground and that can be steered. This would include passenger cars, trucks and buses. This list includes vehicles that the characters of the story would regard as being the products of technological development, as opposed to supernatural or magical forces.

Cars in fiction may closely resemble real-life counterparts with only minor or unintentional deviations from a real-life namesake; such vehicles may still play an important role in a story. Or, the limitations of real cars may be completely ignored for story purposes; in extreme cases, describing the car is the main point of the story.

Literature
 Chitty Chitty Bang Bang - the sometimes-flying car, star of the book/film/musical of the same name
 Christine - a 1958 Plymouth Fury from Stephen King's novel of the same name
 Gumdrop - an Austin Clifton "Heavy" 12/4, the eponymous star of a series of children's books by Val Biro
 The Haunted Car
 The Hirondel - a car that was used often by Simon Templar, otherwise known as the Saint
 Melmoth - a car driven by Humbert Humbert in Vladimir Nabokov's Lolita
Mrs. Merdle - a series of Daimler cars owned by Lord Peter Wimsey, named for the character in Little Dorrit "because of her aversion to 'row'"
Dick Turpin - a car in Good Omens, named for the highwayman Dick Turpin because he "holds up traffic"

Film

Cars in animated films do not belong in this section.

Truckster - station wagon in the 1983 comedy National Lampoon's Vacation.
 Cyclops - an extremely large, nuclear-powered bus in the 1976 comedy The Big Bus
 Bluesmobile - The Blues Brothers, 1980
 Landmaster -  Damnation Alley, 1977
 EM-50 Urban Assault Vehicle - Stripes, 1981
 Hannibal Twin-8 (built by fictional Prof. Fate) - The Great Race, 1965
 Leslie Special (built by fictional Webber Motor Company) - The Great Race, 1965
 Light Cycle - Tron, 1982
 Pursuit Special - Mad Max, 1979
 The Hearse
 Herbie - The Love Bug, 1969
 DeLorean time machine - Back to the Future, 1985
 The Gnome-Mobile
 "Eleanor" - Gone in 60 Seconds, 1974
 The Betsy 1978, based on book by Harold Robbins
 Cars in Death Race 2000 (1975) include The Bull, The Buzzbomb, The Lion, The Alligator and The Turbo
 Cars in Death Race
 Cars in The Fast and Furious The Black Beauty - The Green Hornet
 Ecto-1 - Ghostbusters, 1984
 The Mirthmobile - Wayne's World 1992
 2015 Tartan Prancer - Vacation The Flying Wombat - The Young in Heart Alta Pazolli - Love Potion No. 9 1992

Television and radio
 Baby - a 1967 Chevrolet Impala - Supernatural
 Battle Shell - Teenage Mutant Ninja Turtles
 Bessie - the Third Doctor's yellow roadster in Doctor Who Brum
 Cowabunga Carl Party Van - TMNT
 Foot pedaled cars in The Flinstones
 DRAG-U-LA - Grandpa Munster
 FAB1 - Lady Penelope's Rolls-Royce from Thunderbirds
 Fiat Cinquecento "Hawaii" - Simon Cooper's oft-ridiculed car from The Inbetweeners General Lee - The Dukes of Hazzard Hruck Bubgear - The Middleman KITT and KARR, its evil twin - Knight Rider
 KITT - Knight Rider 2008
 Munster Koach - The Munsters Maximum Security Vehicle - Captain Scarlet and the Mysterons Spectrum Saloon Car (SSC) - Captain Scarlet and the Mysterons Spectrum Pursuit Vehicle - Captain Scarlet and the Mysterons Mannix's automobiles
 The PO-01 Pointer - Ultraseven, car type: a Second Gen. Imperial
 Party Wagon - Teenage Mutant Ninja Turtles
 Rhino - Gerry Anderson's New Captain Scarlet Shellraiser - Teenage Mutant Ninja Turtles
 Turtle Hauler - TMNT: Back to the Sewer Turtle Taxi - Teenage Mutant Ninja Turtles
 Turtle Van - Teenage Mutant Ninja Turtles and Teenage Mutant Ninja Turtles Adventures Viper
 The Man from U.N.C.L.E. car: custom plastic body "cyolac"

Graphic novels, comics, animation and cartoons
 Batcycle -  Several vehicles in Batman (also in TV and film)
 Batmobile - The primary transportation of the DC Comics superhero 'Batman. Note: The Batmobile has taken on many different forms from the 1930s to today and has evolved along with the character in TV, films, and comics.
 Benny the Cab  - Who Framed Roger Rabbit
 Lightning McQueen and multiple other characters - Cars 
 The Mystery Machine - Scooby-Doo
 Arrowcar - Green Arrow's vehicle
 Mach Five - Speed Racer
 Spider-Mobile - vehicle briefly used by Spider-Man
 Susie - from the Disney animated short film Susie the Little Blue Coupe
 The Testarosetta - Sally Forth
 Thunder Machine
 Gadgetmobile - Inspector Gadget
 Jokermobile - Joker's vehicle
 Larrymobile - Larryboy's vehicle (first debuted in VeggieTales in 1997)

Games
 A-51 II APC, Armored Personnel Carrier armed with full-auto variant of the  48 Dredge GPMG ( x4 ) in Call of Duty: Black Ops III
 Driver: Parallel Lines
 Numerous car brands from the Grand Theft Auto series.
 M12 Force Application Vehicle series, commonly known as the Warthog are a series of jeep-like vehicles in the Halo (series). They can be configured with a .50 Caliber anti-aircraft turret, anti material rocket pods, a troop carrier or a Gauss cannon
 Numerous civilian automobiles in Call of Duty: Black Ops III, as they all appeared to be controlled by computers.
 Putt-Putt, a car from the game series by Humongous Entertainment
 Red Bull X2010
 Uncle Jalapeño's car from LittleBigPlanet
Vision Gran Turismo, a series of cars designed by leading manufacturers for use in the Gran Turismo series
 The Marek and RWD Le Mans prototypes and SMS formula racing cars in the Project CARS series
 Falcogini, a luxury car brand from Payday 2
 Quartz Regalia 723, a luxury sedan from Final Fantasy XV

Music

 Ford Timelord, musician, 1968 Ford Galaxie, WGU 18G.

See also
 List of fictional vehicles
 Vaillante a fictional automobile manufacturer
 Grand Theft Auto video game

References

 
Fictional
Cars